Maxence Bibié (11 January 1891 - 24 May 1950) was a French politician.

Bibié was born in Allemans. He represented the Republican-Socialist Party (PRS) from 1924 to 1932, the French Socialist Party (PSF) from 1932 to 1936 and the Socialist Republican Union (USR) in the Chamber of Deputies.

References

1891 births
1950 deaths
People from Dordogne
Politicians from Nouvelle-Aquitaine
Republican-Socialist Party politicians
French Socialist Party (1919) politicians
Socialist Republican Union politicians
Members of the 13th Chamber of Deputies of the French Third Republic
Members of the 14th Chamber of Deputies of the French Third Republic
Members of the 15th Chamber of Deputies of the French Third Republic
Members of the 16th Chamber of Deputies of the French Third Republic